= Ste. Genevieve Bay =

Natural bay in Newfoundland and Labrador, Canada

Coordinates: 51.150°N 56.814°W

Ste. Genevieve Bay is a natural bay off the island of Newfoundland in the province of Newfoundland and Labrador, Canada.
